Tester may refer to:

 Tester (surname)
 Test equipment
 Tester, the upper part of a four-poster bed
 Tester or sounding board, a canopy over a tomb or pulpit 
 "Tester" a song by Anthrax on the album Stomp 442
 The Tester, a reality show produced by Sony about videogame testing
 Software tester, an individual who tests software
 Game tester, a tester of video games

See also
 Test (disambiguation)